Ahmed Bukhari is the 13th Shahi Imam of the Jama Masjid, Delhi.

Ancestry and appointment
Ahmed Bukhari succeeded his father, Abdullah Bukhari, on 14 October 2000 as Shahi Imam of the Jama Masjid in Delhi. On 22 November 2014, his son, Shaban Bukhari, was formally designated to be the next Shahi Imam.

Controversy
In 2014, in an interview with The Times of India, on being asked on his decision of inviting Pakistani Prime Minister Nawaz Sharif and ignoring Indian Prime Minister Narendra Modi, on the anointment ceremony of the naib imam or the imam's deputy, Ahmed Bukhari defended his position saying, "Modi claims to be the Prime Minister of 125 crore Indians but conveniently and deliberately avoids addressing Muslims. He has shown he doesn't like us. He is the one who has been maintaining distance from the community. So, I too chose to maintain my distance."

Though other Muslim leaders like Kamal Farooqi said that such acts gave the entire Muslim community a bad name and stressed that Bukhari didn't represent Indian Muslims.
A criminal case was lodged against him along with Habib-ur-Rehman and Nafisa in 2001, after an incident on 3 September 2001, when a mob, led by Bukhari assaulted on-duty police and civic agencies officials trying to remove encroachments from near CGO Complex in Lodhi Colony. Warrants against Bukhari for this case have been issued repeatedly by the Delhi court. Delhi Police has been unable to arrest him because of communal tension for the past ten years.

During 2015 U.P Assembly Elections, Bukhari wrote a letter to Mulayam Singh Yadav criticizing him for not nominating Muslim candidates to Rajya Sabha. In response, U.P minister  and senior Samajwadi Party leader Azam Khan alleged that Bukhari was accusing the Government of not giving equal rights to Muslims because he  wanted his brother and son in law Umar Ali Khan to get Rajya Sabha Tickets.
 
After the Dadri Lynching Case, Bukhari alleged that Azam Khan cannot go to the place of incident but was talking of going to United Nations to hide his incompetence. He also called Azam ' nihayat badtameez Muslim wazeer'.Azam Khan denied the charge and accused him of being hand in glove with Hindu right wing organizations.

References

Indian imams
21st-century imams
Indian Quran reciters
Indian Islamic religious leaders